Paco Peña (born 1 June 1942) is a Spanish flamenco composer and guitarist. He is regarded as one of the world's foremost traditional flamenco players.

Biography
Born in Córdoba, Spain, as Francisco Peña Pérez, Paco Peña began learning to play the guitar from his brother at age six and made his first professional appearance at twelve. Encouraged by his family, he left home and began performing throughout Spain as part of a government-sponsored folk music and dance program. This led to calls from professional flamenco companies in Madrid and the Costa Brava, where Peña established himself as a highly regarded accompanist to flamenco dance and singing. However, dissatisfied with life on the coast and seeking a new challenge, he moved to London in the late 1960s to become a soloist.

Initially the star attraction in the Restaurante Antonio in Covent Garden, Peña generated so much interest among a British public previously uninitiated in flamenco that he soon found himself sharing concerts with artists such as Jimi Hendrix, and made his solo debut at Wigmore Hall in 1967. It was not long before Peña was touring the world, both as a soloist and an accompanist with performances at Carnegie Hall in New York City, the Royal Albert Hall in London and the Concertgebouw in Amsterdam. He later founded the world's first university course on flamenco guitar, at the Rotterdam conservatory of music. In 1984 Peña was interviewed by Julian Bream for the Channel 4 television series Guitarra! which traces the development of the guitar in Spain.

Peña also created the Centro Flamenco Paco Peña in Córdoba, and was responsible for the founding of the now-celebrated annual Córdoba Guitar Festival, which has seen appearances by other flamenco greats such as Manolo Sanlúcar and Paco de Lucía.

In 1997 Peña was named Oficial de la Cruz de la Orden del Mérito Civil by King Juan Carlos of Spain.

His most famous compositions include his Misa Flamenca (a flamenco Mass), and Requiem for the Earth, both of which have received great critical acclaim.

He has also had a number of notable collaborations, significantly with the Argentinian guitarist Eduardo Falú and the Chilean group Inti-Illimani.

Peña has homes in London and Córdoba. Recent shows include Flamenco Sin Fronteras, which explores the relationship between Venezuelan music and flamenco; and Quimeras, which features the Paco Peña Flamenco Dance Company performing a story about immigrants from Africa arriving in Andalusia.

Peña has collaborated with the classical guitarist John Williams. Peña also provided the chapter on flamenco guitar for the book The Guitar (A Guide For Students And Teachers).

Discography 

CD
 1987 Fragments of a Dream (Inti-Illimani with John Williams)
 1987 Flamenco Guitar Music of Ramón Montoya and Niño Ricardo
 1988 Azahara
 1990 Leyenda (live in Cologne Inti-Illimani with John Williams)
 1991 Misa Flamenca
 1992 Encuentro (with Eduardo Falú)
 1995 The Art of Paco Peña (anthology)
 1999 Arte y Pasión (live, with Company)
 2000 Flamenco Guitar (Montoya/Ricardo & Azahara)
 2003 Flamenco Master: Essential flamenco recordings (anthology)
 2004 Fabulous Flamenco / La Gitarra Flamenca (remastered)
 2007 His Essential Recordings (anthology)
 2007 A Flamenco Guitar Recital (live)
 2007 Requiem for the Earth
 2008 A Compás! (Live, with Company)
 2014 Duo Recital (with Eliot Fisk)
 2015 En estado de gracia
 2018 Con la Verdad por Delante

LP
 1966 Flamenco! (El Sali & his Ballet Espagnol)
 1968 The Incredible Paco Peña
 1969 Carnival (with Los Marachuchos)
 1970 Flamenco
 1970 The Art of Flamenco (with Company)
 1972 Flamenco Puro Live (with Company)
 1973 The Art of the Flamenco Guitar
 1975 Fabulous Flamenco!
 1976 Toques Flamencos (Student pieces, with book)
 1977 La Gitarra  [sic]
 1978 The Flamenco World of Paco Peña
 1979 Live in London
 1980 Live at Sadler's Wells (with Company)
 1985 Flamenco Vivo (live)

DVD
 1985 Guitarra! (Julian Bream) [guest appearance]
 1991 Misa Flamenca

References

External links
 Paco Peña's website
 Music Conservatory and Dance Academy of Rotterdam.
 Rotterdam´s World Music and Dance Centre
 Paco Peña biography and discography
 

1942 births
Living people
Spanish flamenco guitarists
Spanish male guitarists
Flamenco guitarists
Codarts University for the Arts alumni